Tomas Northug (born 19 April 1990) is a Norwegian cross-country skier. He was born in Mosvik, and is the middle brother of Petter Northug and Even Northug.

He won a World Cup victory in Otepää in January 2015. 
He became Junior World Champion in 2010.

He represented the sports clubs Mosvik IL and Strindheim IL.

Cross-country skiing results
All results are sourced from the International Ski Federation (FIS).

World Championships

World Cup

Season standings

Individual podiums
1 victory – (1 )
1 podium – (1 )

References

External links
 

1990 births
Living people
People from Mosvik
Norwegian male cross-country skiers
Sportspeople from Trøndelag